Toon Time is the only studio album by American R&B group N-Toon.  The album was released on March 21, 2000, on the DreamWorks Records label.

Track list 
"Chuckie's Question (interlude)" (0:19)
"A Girl Like That" (4:17)
"Whitney (interlude)" (0:14)
"Shoulda Been My Girl" (4:04)
"Patti (interlude)" (0:15)
"Ready" (3:53)
"Do U Believe" (4:57)
"Ben & Jerry's (interlude)" (0:13)
"Stop That!" (3:09)
"Now You're All Alone" (4:15)
"Happy Father's Day" (6:00)
"Dallas (interlude)" (0:09)
"N-Trow (Lloyd's interlude)" (2:09)
"It's Your Birthday" (2:54)
"Chilli (interlude)" (0:12)
"Lisa Lisa" (4:26)
"Chuckie & Everett (interlude)" (0:16)
"Roses R Red" (3:44)
"Chuckie's Headphones (interlude)" (0:16)
"Crush on You" (4:05)
"Girl in the Tree (dialogue)" (1:29)
"What About Us?" (5:06)
"The Guys Answer (interlude)" (0:15)
"Playaz Gotta Dance" (3:19)

Personnel

N-Toon
Justin Clark
Everett Hall
Lloyd Polite
Chuckie D Reynolds

Additional Personnel
Rick Sheppard
Steve Morales (various instruments)
Tomi Martin (acoustic guitar)
Derek Scott (guitar)
John Harris (piano, background vocals)
David Seigel (keyboards)
Alvin Speights (bass, drums)
C. "Tricky" Stewart (programming)
Debra Killings
Traci Hale
Kandi Burruss
 Keithian Sammons
Jasper Cameron
Kareem Wilson
Taufeeq Wright
Sammie
Joyce Irby
God's Gift Of Praise Young People's Choir

Producers
Dallas Austin
Christopher "Tricky" Stewart
Cyptron
Indiana Joan
Steve Morales

Engineers
Leslie Braithwaite
Kevin "KD" Davis
Mark Goodchild
John Horesco
Rico Lumpkins
Andrew Lyn
Carlton Lynn
James Majors
Keith Morrison
Claudine Pontier
Brian Smith
Alvin Speights
Brian "B-Luv" Thomas

References

2000 debut albums
Contemporary R&B albums by American artists
DreamWorks Records albums
Warner Records albums